Eme 15 is the self-titled debut studio album by Mexican-Argentine pop band, Eme 15. The album was released in Mexico and Latin America on June 26, 2012 through Warner Music México, and features songs from the Nickelodeon Latin America and Televisa musical television series, Miss XV.

Background

Production 
Eme 15 began recording their debut album in Mexico City in August 2011. The album includes 12 songs written by songwriters Carlos Lara, Lynda Thomas, and Pedro Muñoz. A bonus track is included for purchase with iTunes download in Mexico and Latin America. The album was produced by Carlos Lara.

Release 
The album was released in Mexico on June 23, 2012 for special purchase as a physical release at MixUp store locations. On June 26, 2012, the album was available for purchase as a digital download throughout Latin America via iTunes. The album debuted at number 2 in Mexico on July 1, 2012. It reached number one in Mexico on July 23, 2012, and was certified platinum in Mexico for sales of 60,000 or more units.

Re-release
The group recorded four Christmas cover songs and two demos to be included on the re-edition version of their debut album.  The re-edition album was released for digital download in Mexico on iTunes on November 13, 2012. Within 10 days of its release on November 13, 2012, the band's Christmas re-release album was certified gold in Mexico for 30,000 sales or more.

Singles
"Wonderland" was announced as the debut single from Eme 15's debut album. The band debuted their single for the first time at the Mexican Kids Choice Awards in Mexico City in September 2011. Written by songwriters Carlos Lara and Pedro Muñoz, the song also serves as the closing theme for Miss XV. "Solamente Tú" was confirmed as the second official single from Eme 15's debut album. In early October 2012, the band filmed a music video on the beach for their second single, "Solamente Tú" in Acapulco, Mexico. The video premiered exclusively on MTV Latin America's website on October 29, 2012. The single was available for digital download on iTunes for Mexico on October 9, 2012.

Promotional singles
In order to promote the album, three promotional singles were released exclusively through iTunes in Latin America during June 2012. "A Mis Qunice (Miss XV)"  was the first promotional single, released on June 12, 2012. The song serves as the opening theme song to the television series, Miss XV, and features the vocals of Paulina Goto and Natasha Dupeyrón. "Súper Loca"  was announced as the second promotional single, and was released June 19, 2012 on iTunes. The song features the vocals of Eme 15's female members. "Desde Tu Adiós was the third and final promotional single, released on the same day as "Súper Loca". The male members of Eme 15 sing the vocals for this song.

Track listing

Notes
 No Hay Manera is a solo song sung by Paulina Goto.
 Todo Lo Que Quiero en Navidad is a Spanish language cover of Mariah Carey's "All I Want for Christmas Is You".

Chart and certifications

Album certification

Year-end charts

Release history

References

External links 
 Miss XV official website

2012 debut albums
Eme 15 albums
Capitol Records albums
Spanish-language albums